Arna Vågen, née Espeland (12 May 1905 – 24 September 2005) was a Norwegian missionary and politician for the Christian Democratic Party.

She served as a deputy representative to the Norwegian Parliament from Oslo during the term 1961–1965.

Outside politics she was known for being a missionary to China. Her husband Trond Vågen was a long-time secretary general of the Norwegian Lutheran Mission.

References

 (link inactive as of 17 July 2010)

1905 births
2005 deaths
Deputy members of the Storting
Christian Democratic Party (Norway) politicians
Politicians from Oslo
Norwegian expatriates in China
Norwegian centenarians
Female Christian missionaries
Women members of the Storting
Norwegian Lutheran missionaries
Lutheran missionaries in China
20th-century Norwegian women politicians
20th-century Norwegian politicians
Women centenarians
20th-century Lutherans